Black Sun  is a documentary film directed by Gary Tarn. The film premiered at the 2005 Toronto International Film Festival. Tarn received a nomination for the Carl Foreman Award for Special Achievement by a British Director, Writer or Producer in their First Feature Film in 2007 from BAFTA.

Tarn explores the story of Hugues de Montalembert, a New York-based artist and filmmaker who was blinded by a vicious, unprovoked attack by two young assailants in 1978.  After the attack, Montalembert learned to cope with his despair and to go through life a new way, seeking to make ordinary things extraordinary. Defying expectation, this remarkable artist continued to travel the world alone, learning to navigate life in a new and beautiful way. Through creative imagery and philosophical narration, director and composer Gary Tarn creates an expressionist, poetic meditation both on an extraordinary life without vision, and on the idea of perception in general.

See also
Black Sun (alchemy)

References

External links
Black Sun at the Indiepix Films website

2005 documentary films
2005 films
British documentary films
Documentary films about painters
Documentary films about film directors and producers
Documentary films about blind people
Films produced by John Battsek
2000s English-language films
2000s British films